Mthatha Bucks F.C. are a football club based in Mthatha, Eastern Cape, South Africa.

They were promoted to the National First Division in July 2015, having finished as runner-up in the 2014-15 SAFA Second Division.

Mthatha Bucks F.C. were founded following the sale of Happy Brothers F.C.'s franchise license.

References 

Soccer clubs in South Africa
National First Division clubs